The 1957 CCCF Championship, the eighth edition of the CCCF Championship, was held in the Netherlands Antilles. Haiti won the tournament.

Although the competition was hosted in the then newly constituted nation of Netherlands Antilles, the national team of the Netherlands Antilles never adopted the new nation's name until after the 1958 FIFA World Cup qualifiers, continuing to compete until then as Curaçao.

Final standings

Results

References 

CCCF Championship
CCCF
CCCF
1957 in the Netherlands Antilles
1957 in association football
International association football competitions hosted by the Netherlands Antilles
August 1957 sports events in North America